There are two species of lizard named banded rock lizard:
 Petrosaurus mearnsi, native to western North America
 Petrosaurus slevini, from Mexico